1959 Cadillac may refer to:

Third generation Cadillac Eldorado (in production from 1959 to 1966)
Fifth generation Cadillac Series 62 (1959-1964)